Yolande of Brittany (late 1218 – 10 October 1272), also known as Yolande de Dreux, was the ruler of the counties of Penthièvre and Porhoet in the Duchy of Brittany. 
Yolande had been betrothed to King Henry III of England in 1226 at the age of seven years, but married Hugh XI of Lusignan, the half-brother of Henry III. Through Hugh, she became Countess of La Marche and of Angoulême. She was the mother of seven children. From 1250 to 1256, she acted as Regent of La Marche and Angoulême for her son, Hugh XII of Lusignan.

Life 
Yolande was born in Dreux, France at the end of 1218, the only daughter of Pierre de Dreux and Alix, Duchess of Brittany. She had two brothers, John I, Duke of Brittany and Arthur of Brittany (1220–1224). By her father's second marriage to Nicole, she had a half-brother, Olivier de Braine (1231–1279). Her mother, Alix, had died on 21 October 1221, when Yolande was not quite three years old. Yolande's paternal grandparents were Robert II, Count of Dreux and Yolande de Coucy, and her maternal grandparents were Guy de Thouars and Constance, Duchess of Brittany.

Suo Jure Countess
As her dowry, In 1236 Yolande received the titles of Countess of Penthièvre, Dame de la Fère-en-Tardenois, de Chailly, and de Longjumeau which she held suo jure from her brother John I, Duke of Brittany and her father, Pierre Mauclerc, acting as his regent. Her brother also granted her the title of suo jure Countess of Porhoet.

Sometime before 19 October 1226, when she was seven years old, Yolande was betrothed to King Henry III of England.  The marriage never took place.  Blanche, regent of France, wanted to prevent Henry from gaining land or influence in France, and so forced Yolande's father to change her betrothal.  Under this influence, Yolande's second betrothal occurred in March 1227 to John of France, Count of Anjou, the son of King Louis VIII of France and Blanche. The engagement was ended when John died aged thirteen in 1232.

Yolande was affianced a third time in 1231 to Theobald IV, Count of Champagne. As in the case with King Henry and John of France, this betrothal to Theobald also did not result in marriage. 

In January 1236 she married Hugh XI of Lusignan. Hugh XI succeeded his father in 1249 as Count of La Marche and Count of Angoulême. His uterine half-brother was King Henry III of England, to whom Yolande had been betrothed in 1226.

Regency
Yolande's husband Hugh XI was killed at the Battle of Fariskur in Egypt on 6 April 1250. Yolande acted as Regent of La Marche and Angoulême for her eldest son Hugh from 1250 to 1256.

Death
Yolande died at the Chateau de Bouteville, Charente on 10 October 1272. She was buried at the Notre Dame Abbey in Villeneuve-lez-Nantes.

Upon her death, her Breton ennoblements returned to the House of Dreux when the titles of Count of Penthievre and Porhoet were seized by her brother, John I, Duke of Brittany.

Issue
Together Hugh and Yolande had seven children:
 Hugh XII of Lusignan, Count of La Marche and Count of Angoulême (died after 25 August 1270), married 29 January 1254 Jeanne de Fougères, Dame de Fougères by whom he had six children. He died while on crusade.
 Guy of Lusignan, (died 1288/89), Seigneur de Cognac, d'Archiac, and de Couhé; Seigneur de la Fère-en-Tardenois.
 Geoffroy of Lusignan (died 1264)
 Alice of Lusignan (died May 1290), married in 1253 as his first wife, Gilbert de Clare, 6th Earl of Gloucester, by whom she had two daughters.
 Marie of Lusignan (1242- after 11 July 1266), married Robert de Ferrers, 6th Earl of Derby. She died childless.
 Isabelle of Lusignan, Dame de Belleville (1248–1304), married Maurice de Belleville
 Yolande of Lusignan (died 10 November 1305), married Pierre I, Sire de Preaux

Ancestry

Notes

References

Sources

People from Dreux
1218 births
1272 deaths
13th-century Breton people
13th-century Breton women
Penthievre, Countess of, Yolande de Dreux
Yolande de Dreux
French countesses
13th-century women rulers
Porhoët family